Petryanino is a rural locality (a village) in Niginskoye Rural Settlement, Nikolsky District, Vologda Oblast, Russia. The population was 18 as of 2002.

Geography 
Petryanino is located 22 km northwest of Nikolsk (the district's administrative centre) by road. Samylovo is the nearest rural locality.

References 

Rural localities in Nikolsky District, Vologda Oblast